Imhak Station is a subway station on Line 1 of the Incheon Subway in Gyeyang-gu, Incheon, South Korea.

History
The station was opened on October 6, 1999, and in 2014, the screen door was installed.

Station layout

Exits

External links

Metro stations in Incheon
Seoul Metropolitan Subway stations
Railway stations in South Korea opened in 1999
Gyeyang District